Üçoğlan is a village and municipality in the Aghdam District of Azerbaijan. It has a population of 2,555. The municipality consists of the villages of Uchoghlan, Orta Qışlaq, Yusifli, Baharlı, Ballar, Böyükbəyli, Birinci Baharlı, İkinci Baharlı, and Səfərli.

References 

Populated places in Aghdam District

az:Üçoğlan
ms:Uchoghlan